Howard Graham may refer to:

 Howard Graham (Canadian Army officer) (1898–1986), Canadian Army officer and Chief of the General Staff
 Howard Carson Graham (1889–1959), Canadian medical doctor